Richard Marcellais (born January 23, 1947) is a former North Dakota Democratic-NPL Party member of the North Dakota Senate, representing the 9th district.

In November 2008, Marcellais was voted in as the tribal chairman of the Turtle Mountain Band of Chippewa Indians. He ran for re-election in the 2010 election, but his candidacy did not survive during the tribe's primary election; he placed third. In the wake of this defeat, he ran for re-election for his Senate seat, defeating Republican candidate Christopher Albertson.

External links
 North Dakota State Legislature - Senator Richard Marcellais official ND Senate website
 Project Vote Smart - Senator Richard Marcellais (ND) profile
 Follow the Money - Richard Marcellais
 2006 Senate campaign contributions
 North Dakota Democratic-NPL Party - Senator Richard Marcellais profile

1947 births
21st-century American politicians
Living people
Ojibwe people
Native American state legislators
Democratic Party North Dakota state senators